Rhopobota mou is a species of moth of the family Tortricidae. It is found in New Caledonia, in the southwest Pacific Ocean.

The wingspan is about 17 mm. The ground colour of the forewings is white, preserved as two dorsal blotches divided by brownish lines. The remaining area is whitish, suffused with brown and with brownish strigulation (fine streaks) and costal strigulae. The hindwings are whitish, tinged with brown, but darker apically.

References

Moths described in 2013
Eucosmini